Dr. Mayilvahanan Natarajan (born 24 December 1954) is a noted Indian surgeon who has made substantial contributions to the specialties of Orthopedic oncology, Medical training, Health administration, Medical ethics and invention of Custom Mega Prostheses to avoid amputation for Bone tumor patients. For his efforts, he was awarded the Padma Shri by the government of India in 2007.

Mayilvahanan Natarajan, an elected fellow of the National Academy of Medical Sciences, was the 7th Vice Chancellor of  Tamil Nadu Dr. M.G.R. Medical University.

Natarajan received the prestigious recognition of "Pharma Leaders Indian of the Year – Orthopedics” at Pharma Leaders  Power Brand Awards 2018 founded by Satya Brahma. 

Sr. Vice President, Friends of United States

References

External links
  Friends of United States 
 
 The Asia Pacific Musculoskeletal Tumour Society 
 Text books penned by Dr. Mayilvahanan Natarajan 

Indian orthopedic surgeons
Recipients of the Padma Shri in medicine
Madras Medical College alumni
Living people
1954 births
Dr. B. C. Roy Award winners
Fellows of the National Academy of Medical Sciences
Medical doctors from Chennai
20th-century Indian medical doctors
20th-century surgeons